Sandra Nieuwveen (born 28 July 1969) is a Dutch softball player. She competed in the women's tournament at the 1996 Summer Olympics.

References

External links
 

1969 births
Living people
Dutch softball players
Olympic softball players of the Netherlands
Softball players at the 1996 Summer Olympics
Sportspeople from Alkmaar